Bryan Frear (8 July 1933 – 1997) was an English professional footballer who played in the Football League as a striker for Huddersfield Town, Chesterfield and Halifax Town.

References

1933 births
1997 deaths
People from Cleckheaton
English footballers
Association football forwards
Huddersfield Town A.F.C. players
Chesterfield F.C. players
Halifax Town A.F.C. players
English Football League players
Sportspeople from Yorkshire